Sipoteni is a commune in Călărași District, Moldova. It is composed of two villages, Podul Lung and Sipoteni.

References

Communes of Călărași District